Drahňov is a village and municipality in Michalovce District in the Kosice Region of eastern Slovakia.

History
In historical records the village was first mentioned in 1315.

Geography
The village lies at an altitude of 110 metres and covers an area of  (2020-06-30/-07-01).

Ethnicity
In 2001 60% of the population was Hungarian and 40% Slovak.

Population 
It has a population of 1,603 people (2020-12-31).

Government

The village relies on the tax and district offices, fire brigade and police force at Veľké Kapušany.

Culture
The village has a small public library, a post office, and a food store.

Sports
The village has a football pitch.

Transport
The village has a railway station.

Genealogical resources

The records for genealogical research are available at the state archive "Statny Archiv in Kosice, Presov, Slovakia"

 Roman Catholic church records (births/marriages/deaths): 1727-1923 (parish B)
 Reformated church records (births/marriages/deaths): 1793-1938 (parish A)

See also
 List of municipalities and towns in Slovakia

References

External links
https://web.archive.org/web/20071116010355/http://www.statistics.sk/mosmis/eng/run.html
Surnames of living people in Drahnov

Villages and municipalities in Michalovce District